Tiout may refer to,
Tiout, Algeria
Tiout, Morocco